Blair Township may refer to:
 Blair Township, Clay County, Illinois
 Blair Township, Michigan
 Blair Township, Pennsylvania

Township name disambiguation pages